Greenfield University is a private university in Kaduna, Kaduna State, Nigeria. It was established in January 2019, and commenced the 2018/19 session in May 2019. According to the pro chancellor Simon Nwakacha, "the university has completed arrangement to start with two faculties, namely; the faculty of social and management sciences and the faculty of science and technology."

A mass kidnapping of students occurred in 2021.

Library 
The university library was established in 2019 to support teaching, learning and research for meeting objectives of the university.

References

External links
Greenfield University official website

2019 establishments in Nigeria
Education in Kaduna State
Educational institutions established in 2019
Universities and colleges in Kaduna State